The 2018 European Championship was the 14th European Championship in American football. The final tournament was played in Vantaa, Finland from 29 July to 4 August 2018.

Qualification
The Qualification for the European Championship 2018 was held in three stages. In the first round, twelve teams played a single playoff round. The six winners and two further teams played the second round, in two tournaments of four teams. Another two teams entered the qualification in the third round in playoff games against the two tournament winners of the second round. Four teams were already qualified for the European Championship 2018. Altogether an all-time record number of twenty teams competed to win the European title in 2018. One team, Germany, did not play a single game due to the national federation of American Football in Germany having an unresolved dispute with IFAF.

First round
The first round was played from August to October 2015. Six of the twelve teams took part in one of the tournaments of the last championship. These were the seeded teams playing against an unseeded team. The seeded teams were the hosts of their playoff game. Israel defeating Spain was the only unseeded team to make it to the next round.

Second round
The second round tournaments were played in 2016. As runner-up and third in the B Group Tournament in 2013, Italy and Great Britain earned a spot as the host nation of one of the tournaments.

Tournament in Italy

Tournament in Great Britain

Third round
Italy and Great Britain, as the winners of the tournaments in Italy and Great Britain, were respectively assigned to play against Sweden and Denmark (fifth and sixth place at the 2014 EFAF Championship), with the winners advancing to the 2018 tournament.

In June 2017, Italy was announced to have qualified for the final tournament as only one of the four teams without any match played. Finland, who was already qualified, did not appear on the schedule. No reasons were given.

In March 2018, IFAF New York announced to have Sweden, Denmark, and Great Britain advancing to the final tournament. Now reigning Champion Germany and Italy were not on the list. Again, no reasons were given. On 28 March, the website American Football International reported that the reason for Germany not joining was due to the teams in the German Football League voting not to change the league schedule to accommodate the European Championships.

Teams
 (2014 Fourth-placed, host)
 (2014 Runner-up)
 (2014 Third-placed)
 (Qualifier)
 (Qualifier)
 (Qualifier)

Venue
All games were played at Myyrmäen jalkapallostadion in Vantaa, Finland

Group stages

Group A

Standings

Schedule

Group B

Standings

Schedule

Finals

See also
International Federation of American Football

References

External links
 IFAF European Championship – official Page

2018
2018 in American football
July 2018 sports events in Europe
August 2018 sports events in Europe